The Honeywell HTF7000 is a turbofan engine produced by Honeywell Aerospace. Rated in the  range, the HTF7000 is used on the Bombardier Challenger 300/350, Gulfstream G280 and Embraer Legacy 500/450 and the Cessna Citation Longitude.
Its architecture could be extended for a range of  thrust.

Operational history 

The engine was originally designated the AS907, which was changed in 2004 to HTF7000; the AS907 designation is still used for legal and regulatory use.
By October 2016, 2.6 million hours had been logged by 1,400 in service engines and it has a 99.9% dispatch reliability rate.
Average fuel consumption is about  lb. per hour for a 7,765 lbf engine on a G280, to be compared to  lb. per hour for a 4,420 lbf TFE731 on a G150.
More than 3.5 million flight hours have been logged till October 2017, and the 2,000th engine should be delivered in 2018.

Honeywell maintenance program is $447 for two engines per hour.
Borescope inspections extends time between overhaul and some engines have remained installed for up to 10,000 hr.
It has line replaceable components installed with hand tools and is designed for on-condition maintenance.

Variants
HTF5000 / AS905
A  thrust variant, unsuccessfully targeted toward the Dassault Falcon 7X.

HTF7000 / AS907-1-1A
 original variant of the engine. Developed for the Bombardier Challenger 300.

AS977
 Higher thrust variant of the AS907, designed at the same time, intended to power BAE System's Avro RJX. The aircraft was cancelled after three airframes were built and flown; subsequently this variant never entered production.

HTF7250G / AS907-2-1G
 variant developed for use on the Gulfstream G280.

HTF7350 / AS907-2-1A
 Variant developed for use on the Bombardier Challenger 350.

HTF7500E / AS907-3-1E
 variant developed for the Embraer Legacy 500/450 business jets and the Praetor 500/600.

HTF7700L / AS907-2-1S
  for the Cessna Citation Longitude.

HTF10000
A  nominal thrust variant.

Applications
Bombardier Challenger 300/350
Cessna Citation Longitude
Gulfstream G280
Embraer Legacy 500/450

Specifications

See also

References

External links

 
 

Honeywell
High-bypass turbofan engines
2000s turbofan engines